The 2008 Arab League summit was held in Damascus on March 29, 2008. The summit was marred by inter-Arab differences, mainly over the political deadlock in Lebanon, with relations between Syria and the Saudi-Egypt coalition reaching an all-time low. Saudi Arabia and Egypt snubbed the summit by sending low-level representatives. Lebanon's majority government boycotted the summit

References

External links
 Official Website of the Summit (Arabic)

2008 Arab League summit
2008 in Syria
Events in Damascus
Diplomatic conferences in Syria
21st-century diplomatic conferences (MENA)
2008 in international relations
2008 conferences
21st century in Damascus
March 2008 events in Asia